When I Was a Singer is a 2006 French musical romantic drama film starring Gérard Depardieu and Cécile de France. It was written and directed by Xavier Giannoli.

Plot
Alain Moreau sings for one of the few remaining dance-bands in Clermont-Ferrand. Though something of an idol amongst his female audience he has a melancholic awareness of the slow disappearance of that audience and of his advancing years. He is completely knocked off balance when he meets strikingly attractive and much younger businesswoman Marion. She seems distant and apparently otherwise involved but soon shows quiet signs of reciprocating his interest. A brief dalliance turns into something much more complicated and he starts to employ - indeed monopolise - her services as an estate agent by announcing he suddenly must move house.

Cast
 Gérard Depardieu as Alain Moreau
 Cécile De France as Marion
 Mathieu Amalric as Bruno
 Christine Citti as Michèle
 Patrick Pineau as Daniel
 Alain Chanone as Philippe Mariani
 Christophe as himself
 Jean-Pierre Gos as The mayor

Awards and nominations
Cannes Film Festival (France) 
Nominated: Golden Palm (Xavier Giannoli)
César Awards (France)
Won: Best Sound (Gabriel Hafner and François Musy)
Nominated: Best Actor – Leading Role (Gérard Depardieu)
Nominated: Best Actress – Leading Role (Cécile De France)
Nominated: Best Actress – Supporting Role (Christine Citti)
Nominated: Best Editing (Martine Giordano) 
Nominated: Best Film
Nominated: Best Writing – Original (Xavier Giannoli)

Alternative titles
Quand j'étais chanteur was released in the United Kingdom under the title The Singer.

References

External links
 
 

2006 films
French romantic drama films
2000s French-language films
Films directed by Xavier Giannoli
2006 romantic drama films
2000s musical drama films
Films featuring a Best Actor Lumières Award-winning performance
Films scored by Alexandre Desplat
2000s romantic musical films
2000s French films